Lambir may refer to:
Lambir (federal constituency), formerly represented in the Dewan Rakyat (1978–90)
Lambir (state constituency), represented in the Sarawak State Legislative Assembly